Emil Bisttram (1895–1976) was an American artist who lived in New York and Taos, New Mexico, who is known for his modernist work.

Life and works

Emil Bisttram was born in Nagylak, Hungary in 1895 (today Nădlac, Romania). When he was 11 years old, he immigrated with his family to New York City, where they settled in the Lower East Side. He was a talented artist, and after a few years began his schooling at the National Academy of Art and Design, then Cooper Union, Parsons, and The Art Student's League. He began teaching soon after completing school, first at the New York School of Fine and Applied Arts, and then at the Master Institute of the Roerich Museum.

Bisttram first visited Taos in the summer of 1930. He later fell in love with the scenery and moved there. In 1931 he won a Guggenheim Fellowship to study mural painting. The fellowship enabled Bisttram to travel to Mexico where he studied mural painting with the world famous muralist Diego Rivera. During the Great Depression he completed numerous federally supported mural commissions, including at the Robert F. Kennedy Building in Washington D.C., The Taos County Courthouse, New Mexico, and the Federal Courthouse in Roswell, New Mexico. After returning to Taos in 1932, Bistrram started the Heptagon Gallery and the Taos School of Art. In 1938, Bisttram founded the Transcendental Painting Group with Raymond Jonson and several other Santa Fe artists.

In 1952, Bisttram co-founded the Taos Art Association, and later in 1959 won the Grand Prize for painting at the New Mexico State Fair.

In 1970, Emil Bisttram served as a judge and monitor for a statewide arts grant competition for art to be placed in the newly constructed County Courthouse building, designed by architect Bill Menningbach of Taos. Ken Drew, a local sculptor, won the competition. Bisttram oversaw the project for the next two years, and in June 1972 Drew completed the installation. Then-Senator Joseph Montoya and other dignitaries from Santa Fe officiated at the dedication ceremonies. In 1975, his birthday, April 7, was declared "Emil Bisttram Day," a New Mexico state holiday.

Public collections
His work can be found in the following public collections: 
 New Mexico Museum of Art
 Albuquerque Museum
 Philadelphia Museum of Art
 Phoenix Art Museum
 Smithsonian American Art Museum
 Los Angeles County Museum of Art
 Metropolitan Museum of Art
 Nora Eccles Harrison Museum of Art - Utah State University
 Portland Museum of Art
  Denver Art Museum

References

Sources
 Pintores Press; 1st edition (1988). The transcendental art of Emil Bisttram by Emil Bisttram . 

1895 births
1976 deaths
20th-century American painters
Abstract painters
American Impressionist painters
American art educators
American male painters
Art Students League of New York alumni
Painters from New York City
Artists from Taos, New Mexico
Austro-Hungarian emigrants to the United States
Cooper Union alumni
Modern painters
People from Nădlac
Treasury Relief Art Project artists